Anapos was a water god of eastern Sicily in Greek mythology. When he opposed the rape of Persephone along with the nymph Cyane, Hades turned them into a river (the river Anapo in southern Sicily) and a fountain, respectively.

References

Potamoi
Rape of Persephone